Alice Maud Fanner, later Alice Maud Taite, (1865 – 1930) was a British landscape painter.

Biography
Fanner was born in Surrey and for many years lived in the Chiswick area of London. She studied at the Richmond School of Art  and also taught there. She attended Slade School of Art in London. She was a pupil of Albert Julius Olsson. Like Olsson, Fanner often painted the sea and the coast, as well as yachts and sailing scenes. Riverside Landscape was included in the book Women Painters of the World. She had five paintings shown at the Royal Academy in London, the first of which was exhibited there in 1897. Fanner was a member of the New English Art Club and exhibited multiple works there between 1897 and 1917.

References

External links

1865 births
1930 deaths
People from Surrey
English women painters
British landscape painters
Alumni of the Slade School of Fine Art
19th-century English painters
19th-century English women artists
20th-century English painters
20th-century English women artists